Yusuke Torigoe (鳥越 裕介, born July 1, 1971 in Usuki, Ōita, Japan), nicknamed "Usuki", is a former Nippon Professional Baseball infielder.

References

External links

1971 births
Living people
Chunichi Dragons players
Fukuoka Daiei Hawks players
Fukuoka SoftBank Hawks players
Japanese baseball coaches
Japanese baseball players
Meiji University alumni
Nippon Professional Baseball infielders
Nippon Professional Baseball coaches
Baseball people from Ōita Prefecture